Thomas Parker (birth unknown – death unknown) was a Welsh professional rugby league footballer who played in the 1920s and 1930s.

Playing career

International honours
Tommy Parker won 2 caps for Wales in 1928–1930 while at Wigan.

County honours
Tommy Parker played right-, i.e. number 3, in Glamorgan's 18-14 victory over Monmouthshire in the non-County Championship match during the 1926–27 season at Taff Vale Park, Pontypridd on Saturday 30 April 1927.

Championship final appearances
Tommy Parker played left-, i.e. number 4, in Wigan's 22-10 victory over Warrington in the Championship Final during the 1925–26 season at Knowsley Road, St. Helens on Saturday 8 May 1926.

County Cup Final appearances
Tommy Parker played left-, i.e. number 4, in Wigan's 5-4 victory over Widnes in the 1928–29 Lancashire County Cup Final during the 1928–29 season at Wilderspool Stadium, Warrington on Saturday 24 November 1928.

References

External links
Statistics at wigan.rlfans.com

Year of birth uncertain
Year of death uncertain
Glamorgan rugby league team players
Place of birth missing
Place of death missing
Racing Club Albi coaches
Rugby league centres
Rugby league players from Neath Port Talbot
Wales national rugby league team players
Welsh rugby league players
Wigan Warriors players